Thumptown (also Trumptown) is an unincorporated community in Delmar Township, Tioga County, Pennsylvania, United States.

Notes

Unincorporated communities in Tioga County, Pennsylvania
Unincorporated communities in Pennsylvania